Hesperumia fumosaria is a species of geometrid moth in the family Geometridae. It is found in North America.

The MONA or Hodges number for Hesperumia fumosaria is 6432.

Subspecies
These two subspecies belong to the species Hesperumia fumosaria:
 Hesperumia fumosaria fumosaria
 Hesperumia fumosaria impensa Rindge, 1974

References

Further reading

 

Boarmiini
Articles created by Qbugbot
Moths described in 1937